State Highway 243 (SH 243) is a state highway that runs from Kaufman east to Canton. The route was designated on February 10, 1937 from Kaufman through Canton to Van, replacing a section of SH 110, which was rerouted off of this road. The section from Canton to Van was removed on March 26, 1942 when it was transferred to FM 16. On May 23, 1951, FM 1654 was designated from SH 243 & SH 198 to SH 64. When completed, FM 1654 was signed, but not designated, as SH 243. On July 16, 1957, SH 243 was extended west to new US 175. On August 29, 1990, SH 243 was extended to SH 64 over FM 1654.

Junction list

References

243
Transportation in Kaufman County, Texas
Transportation in Van Zandt County, Texas